Yves Boutet (3 October 1936 – 15 July 2021) was a French professional footballer who played as a central defender.

Career
Born in Rennes, Boutet played for Rennes between 1955 and 1967, making 394 appearances and captaining them in the 1965 Coupe de France Final. He later played for Lorient between 1967 and 1970.

References

1936 births
2021 deaths
Footballers from Rennes
French footballers
Association football central defenders
Stade Rennais F.C. players
FC Lorient players
Ligue 1 players
French football managers
FC Lorient managers